Topping may refer to:

 Hill-topping, a mate-acquisition strategy amongst insects
 Topping, slang term for capital punishment, especially hanging or beheading
 Topping (surname), the name of several people
 Topping (agriculture), a practice used to prevent seed distribution
 Top, bottom and versatile, a sexual role
 Topping from the bottom, a BDSM term
 Topping cycle, a cycle used in power plants
 Topping out, a ceremony at the completion of a building construction
 Tree topping, the practice of removing branches from the top of a tree

Places:
 Topping, Ontario, a community in Southwestern Ontario, Canada
 Roseberry Topping, a hill in England

Foods:
 Pizza topping, a food on top of pizza
 Wet walnut topping, a dessert topping made from walnuts and maple syrup
 Whipped topping, a non-dairy whipped cream substitute

See also
 Topper (disambiguation)